Jean-Baptiste Cinéas (1895 - 1958) was a Haitian novelist and jurist. Born in Cap-Haïtien, Cinéas held a law degree and was appointed a judge of the Supreme Court of Haiti, a position he held until his death. His most well-known novels are Le Drame de la Terre (1933), La Vengeance de la Terre (1940), L'Héritage Sacré (1945), and Le Choc en Retour (1949).

References

 

1895 births
1958 deaths
Haitian judges
Haitian male novelists
People from Cap-Haïtien
20th-century Haitian novelists
20th-century male writers